Five ships of the Royal Navy have been named HMS Calcutta, after the Indian city of Calcutta (now Kolkata).

 The first  was a 54-gun fourth rate, originally the East Indiaman Warley and purchased in 1795, captured by the French in 1805 and destroyed by British ships in 1809.
 The second  was an 84-gun second rate launched in 1831, converted to a gunnery training ship in 1865 and sold in 1908.
 The fourth Calcutta was the gunboat , renamed Calcutta in 1916.
 The fifth  was a light cruiser launched in 1918 and sunk in action in 1941.

See also
 

Royal Navy ship names